Union Sportive d'Oyem is a Gabonese football club based in Oyem, Woleu-Ntem province, playing the top division of Gabonese football, the Gabon Championnat National D1. They play at Stade d'Akouakam.

Current squad

External links
Les-Pantheres.com (in French)

Oyem
Woleu-Ntem Province